Megachile obliqua is a species of bee in the family Megachilidae. It was described by Mitchell in 1930.

References

Obliqua
Insects described in 1930